Mihkel Tüür (born 2 July 1976 in Tallinn) is an Estonian architect.

Tüür studied in the Estonian Academy of Arts in the department of architecture and city planning. He studied architecture 1996/7 in Ecole d'Architecture Paris Vale de Marne and 1999/2000 in Virginia Tech Architectural Consortium in Washington DC. He graduated from the Estonian Academy of Arts in 2001.

Tüür works in the architectural bureau KTA (Kadarik Tüür Arhitektid OÜ).

Notable works by Tüür are the central square of Rakvere, the apartment buildings in Laagri, Tallinn, the four apartment buildings in Rotermanni Quarter and the new apartment building in the old town of Tallinn. Tüür is a member of Union of Estonian Architects.

Works
 Apartment building on Põldma Street, 2003 (with Ott Kadarik) 
 Apartment buildings in Laagri, 2003 (with Ott Kadarik, Villem Tomiste) 
 Central square of Rakvere, 2004 (with Villem Tomiste, Ott Kadarik Veronika Valk) 
 Duplexes on Põdrakanepi Street, 2005 (with Ott Kadarik, Villem Tomiste) 
 Apartment buildings in Rotermanni Quarter, 2007 (with Ott Kadarik, Villem Tomiste) 
 Apartment building in Old Town of Tallinn, 2009 (with Ott Kadarik, Villem Tomiste)

Competitions
1997	Ärihoone Kuressaares honorable mention M.Maiste, R.Kotov
1999	Tamme staadioni tribüün	II prize O.Kadarik
2000	Pärnu Sütevaka kooli võimla arhitektuurivõistlus II prize O.Kadarik
2001	Urva 7 kortermaja kutsutud võistlus I prize O.Kadarik
2002	Mustjõe detailplaneering I prize V.Tomiste, O.Kadarik
2002	Kalevi kommivabriku ala planeering ostupreemia V.Tomiste, O.Kadarik
2003	Aia tänava äri- ja kortermaja kutsutud võistlus I prize V.Tomiste, O.Kadarik
2003	Tartu Emajõeäärse ala planeeringuvõistlus III prize V.Tomiste, O.Kadarik
2003	Kipsala saare planeeringuvõistlus runner-up V.Tomiste, O.Kadarik
2003	Linnahalli ümberehitus I-II prize V.Tomiste, O.Kadarik
2003	Tartu mnt.63, Marati kvartali juurdeehitus I prize V.Tomiste, O.Kadarik
2003	Marati Kvartali arhitektuurivõistlus I prize V.Tomiste, O.Kadarik, P.Ulman
2003	Paadi tänava hotelli kutsutud arhitektuurivõistlus I prize V.Tomiste, O.Kadarik, T.Hayashi
2003	Viimsi Koolimaja arhitektuurivõistlus ost V.Tomiste, O.Kadarik
2004	Rottermanni kvartali kutsutud arhitektuurivõistlus I prize V.Tomiste, O.Kadarik
2004	Tartu Fortuuna kvartali arhitektuurivõistlus III prize V.Tomiste, O.Kadarik
2004	Viljandi metsakalmistu kabel	äramärgitud V.Tomiste, O.Kadarik
2005	Tartu Mõisavahe hoonestuskava ideekonkurss I prize V.Tomiste, O.Kadarik
2005	Tallinna Pritsumaja kvartali hoonestus, kutsutud võistlus I prize V.Tomiste, O.Kadarik
2005	ERMi uue hoone arhitektuurivõistlus ostupreemia	V.Tomiste, O.Kadarik
2005	Kliversala saare planeeringuvõistlus ostupreemia V.Tomiste, O.Kadarik
2005	Skoone bastioni planeeringuvõistlus III prize V.Tomiste, O.Kadarik, P.Ulman
2006	Kiviõli Linnaväljaku arhitektuurivõistlus ostupreemia V.Tomiste, O.Kadarik, K.Kivi
2006	Maakri Kvartali arhitektuurivõistlus runner-up V.Tomiste, O.Kadarik
2006	Juhkentali Kvartali kutsutud arhitektuurivõistlus I prize V.Tomiste, O.Kadarik
2006	Paide Spordihalli arhitektuurivõistlus I prize V.Tomiste, O.Kadarik
2006	Pärnu Jõeäärse Planeeringu ideevõistlus III prize V.Tomiste, O.Kadarik
2006	TTÜ Raamatukogu arhitektuurivõistlus III prize V.Tomiste
2007	Patarei ja Lennusadama ala planeeringuvõistlus III prize V.Tomiste
2007	Paide Kutsekooli arhitektuurivõistlus I prize V.Tomiste, O.Kadarik
2007	Tamsalu keskosa ruumiline planeerimine III prize V.Tomiste, O.Kadarik
2007	Vabaõhumuuseumi arhitektuurivõistlus ostupreemia V.Tomiste, O.Kadarik
2008	Viljandi Kultuuriakadeemia uue hoone arhitektuurivõistlus honorable mention V.Tomiste, R.Poo-puu
2009	Kultuuritehase arhitektuurivõistlus III prize V.Tomiste, O.Kadarik
2009	Luther quarter urban planning competition I prize

Articles
MAJA 07.2008 Biooniline arhitektuur 
EE 21.12.2007 Võimalus ehitada kergelt

References
Union of Estonian Architects, members
Architectural Bureau KOSMOS OÜ
Kadarik Tüür Arhitektid OÜ

1976 births
Living people
Architects from Tallinn